Michael Evgenevich Verner (Russian - Михаил Евгеньевич Вернер; 1881–1941) was a Soviet film director and painter, notable as one of the founders and leaders of cinematography in Ukraine. He set his films both before and after the Russian Revolution and his oeuvre is dominated by comedy.  He directed Late for a Date for Belgoskino.

Films
Late for a Date

External links

Mikhail Verner biography (Russian Language) on Permski Krai
Mikhail Verner Biography (Russian Language) on Kino USSR

Soviet film directors
Ukrainian film directors
1881 births
1941 deaths